Léon Brunschvicg (10 November 1869 – 18 January 1944) was a French Idealist philosopher. He co-founded the Revue de métaphysique et de morale with Xavier Leon and Élie Halévy in 1893.

Life
He was born into a Jewish family.

From 1895 to 1900 he taught at the Lycée Pierre Corneille in Rouen. In 1897 he completed his thesis under the title  (The Modalities of Judgement). In 1909 he became professor of philosophy at the Sorbonne.  He was married to Cécile Kahn, a major campaigner for women's suffrage in France, with whom he had four children.

While at the Sorbonne, Brunschvicg was the supervisor for Simone de Beauvoir's masters thesis (on the ideas of Leibniz).

Forced to leave his position at the Sorbonne by the Nazis, Brunschvicg fled to the south of France, where he died at the age of 74. While in hiding, he wrote studies of Montaigne, Descartes, and Pascal that were printed in Switzerland. He composed a manual of philosophy dedicated to his teenage granddaughter entitled Héritage de Mots, Héritage d'Idées (Legacy of Words, Legacy of Ideas) which was published posthumously after the liberation of France. His reinterpretation of Descartes has become the foundation for a new idealism.

Brunschvicg defined philosophy as "the mind's methodical self-reflection" and gave a central role to judgement.

The publication of Brunschvicg's oeuvre has been recently completed after unpublished materials held in Russia were returned to his family in 2001.

Works (selected)
, Paris, Alcan, 1897.
, Paris, Alcan, 1923.
, Paris, Alcan, 1905.
, Paris, Alcan, 1912.
, Paris, Alcan, 1922.
, Paris, Alcan, 1927.
, Paris, Hermann, 1939.
, Paris, Alcan, 1939.
, Paris, La Baconnière, 1942.
, Paris, PUF, 1945.
, 1892–1942, Paris, Minuit, 1948.
, Paris, PUF, 1949.
, Paris, PUF, 1950.
, Paris: PUF, 1951.
, Paris: PUF, 1954.
, Paris: PUF, 1958.

English translations
Lafrance, Jean-David: "Physics and Metaphysics" and "On the Relations of Intellectual Consciousness and Moral Consciousness" in The Philosophical Forum, 2006, Volume 37, Issue 1, pages 53–74.

Notes

Further reading
René Boirel, Brunschvicg. Sa vie, son œuvre avec un exposé de sa philosophie, Paris, PUF, 1964.
Marcel Deschoux, La philosophie de Léon Brunschvicg, Paris, PUF, 1949.
Gary Gutting, French Philosophy in the Twentieth Century, Cambridge University Press, 2001.

External links
 
 Allrefer.com entry

1869 births
1944 deaths
19th-century French non-fiction writers
19th-century French philosophers
19th-century male writers
19th-century philosophers
20th-century French non-fiction writers
20th-century French philosophers
20th-century French writers
20th-century male writers
Continental philosophers
École Normale Supérieure alumni
Epistemologists
19th-century French Jews
French historians of philosophy
French male non-fiction writers
French male writers
Idealists
Jewish philosophers
Members of the Académie des sciences morales et politiques
Ontologists
Philosophers of culture
Philosophers of education
Philosophers of history
Philosophers of mathematics
Philosophers of mind
Spinoza scholars
Academic staff of the University of Paris
Writers from Paris
Male feminists